Ilex ciliolata is a species of plant in the family Aquifoliaceae. It is endemic to Venezuela.

References

ciliolata
Endemic flora of Venezuela
Near threatened plants
Near threatened biota of South America
Taxonomy articles created by Polbot